David Herr Rank (January 2, 1907 – January 17, 1981) was an American spectroscopist.

Rank was born in Annville, Pennsylvania and attended Lebanon Valley College in his hometown. He pursued graduate study at Pennsylvania State University beginning in 1930 and joined the faculty in 1935. Rank was appointed the Evan Pugh Professor in Physics in 1961. He retired in 1972 and died at Centre County Community Hospital in State College, Pennsylvania, on January 17, 1981, aged 74.

References

1907 births
1981 deaths
20th-century American physicists
Lebanon Valley College alumni
Eberly College of Science alumni
Pennsylvania State University faculty
People from Lebanon County, Pennsylvania
Spectroscopists